Broggi is an Italian surname meaning "amber" mostly found in northern Italy. Notable people with the surname include:

Alberto Broggi (born 1966), Italian professor, key person in vehicular robotics
Ariel Broggi (born 1983), Argentine football defender
Luigi Broggi (1851–1926), Italian architect
Ugo Broggi (1880–1965), Italian actuary, mathematician, statistician, and economist

Italian-language surnames